Giant Shoe Museum (sometimes the  World Famous Giant Shoe Museum) is a museum in Seattle's Pike Place Market, in the U.S. state of Washington.

Description 

The museum has "odd and outsize shoes displayed behind sideshow-style curtains", according to Harriet Baskas of CNBC. The one-wall exhibit allows guests to view shoes through a stereoscope. It has been described as "the world's largest collection of giant shoes", as well as "likely one of the world's few coin-operated museums".

History 
The museum was designed and built by Sven Soundbaum in 1997. Owned and operated by adjacent Old Seattle Paperworks, the exhibit is curated by Dan Eskenazi.

Reception 
Cody Permenter included the museum in Thrillist's 2015 list of "The 11 Strangest Museums in (and Around) Seattle". Christina Ausley of the Seattle Post-Intelligencer included the Giant Shoe Museum in a 2020 overview of the city's 14 "strangest" landmarks, writing: "Drop a humble 50 cents into a small coin box for the world's largest collection of giant shoes. Nestled a few floors below downtown Seattle's Pike Place Market, approach the flamboyant circus entryway and gaze through the binoculars for a myriad of Herculean hi-tops and a size 37 work by Robert Wadlow."

See also 

 List of museums in Seattle

References

External links 

 Giant Shoe Museum at Pike Place Market
 Giant Shoe Museum at Roadside America
 World Famous Giant Shoe Museum at Atlas Obscura

1997 establishments in Washington (state)
Central Waterfront, Seattle
Museums established in 1997
Museums in Seattle
Pike Place Market